Penn Valley may refer to:

Penn Valley, California, a census-designated place in Nevada County, California
Penn Valley, Pennsylvania, a suburb in Lower Merion, Pennsylvania
Penn Valley Park a park overlooking Downtown Kansas City
Penn Valley (California), a valley in Nevada County